The Round House was the first permanent building built in the Swan River Colony.  Built in late 1830 and opened in 1831, it is the oldest building still standing in Western Australia.

It is located at Arthur Head in Fremantle, and recent heritage assessments and appraisals of the precinct of the Round House incorporate Arthur Head.

Design and construction

It was designed by Henry Willey Reveley; construction commenced in 1830 and was completed on 18 January 1831. Intended as a prison, it had eight cells and a jailer's residence, all of which opened onto a central courtyard.  The design was based on the Panopticon, a kind of prison designed by philosopher Jeremy Bentham.

The Round House was built by Richard Lewis in partnership with W Manning and J H Duffield for £1,840. Worked commenced in August 1830 and was complete in January 1831 for the cost of £1603/10/0 this lower cost was due to the builders' being able to source the limestone locally. In 1833, a well was dug in the central compound.  Reveley calculated that the depth of the well needed to be . The Fremantle Whaling Company in 1837 requested that a tunnel be dug through Arthur Head to High street. As part of the agreement, they constructed a breakwater to protect shipping up to 150 tons. The company paid for both the construction of the tunnel and the breakwater, with Reverley overseeing both.

The tunnel was 57 metres long and linked the Bathers Beach Whaling Station to the High Street. The tunnel was constructed in five months and completed in January 1838. This rapid progress was possible because prisoners from the Round House were used and the rock, although load bearing and sound, was capable of being mined with a pickaxe. Today the tunnel is only 45 metres long, as the cliffs were cut back some time after 1880.

Usage
The Round House was used for colonial and indigenous prisoners until 1886, when control of the Convict Establishment prison (now Fremantle Prison) was transferred to the colony.  After that, the Round House was used as a police lockup until 1900, when it became the living quarters for the chief constable and his family.

As early as 1903 its removal had been suggested; again in 1929 unsuccessful suggestions were made to remove the Round House.

In 1936, it was vested in the Fremantle Harbour Trust for preservation. A number of suggestions were put forth, including turning it into a museum, but these plans were interrupted by World War II.

In 1966, the Port Authority opened the building to the public for two hours per day. Later, this attraction was run by the Western Australian Historical Society. The building was transferred to the City of Fremantle in 1982 and has been open daily since then.

Prisoners
  Yagan

Executions
The first person of European descent to be executed in Western Australia was 15-year-old John Gavin. Gavin confessed to the murder of George Pollard and was held in the Round House until he was hanged on 6 April 1844. His body was buried south of the Round House.

Preservation
The Round House had a plaque placed by the Royal Western Australian Historical Society as part of the commemoration of historical sites in the Western Australia centenary year of 1929.  However, in the 1940s and 1950s it was used as storage site, raising concerns about its condition as a result.

Tourist site
The Fremantle City Council took over responsibility for the Round House in 1982, and it was opened to the public shortly afterwards.

It is operated by the Fremantle Volunteer Heritage Guides; entry is by donation. Special events at the location which require facilities incur costs.

References

Further reading
 Davidson, Dianne.(2001) The rescue of the round house. Newsletter (Fremantle History Society), Summer, 2001, p. 1-3,
 Scott, Peter.(1989) Hiding history : The Round House. (Aboriginal imprisonment in the Round House). Murdoch ethos, p. 37-50, (essays in Australian history in honour of Foundation Professor Geoffrey Bolton) edited by Rae Frances and Bruce Scates. Murdoch, W.A.: Murdoch University. – see also 
 Webb, David and Warren, David (2005) Fremantle: Beyond the Round House Fremantle, Longley Books.

External links
 
 State Heritage Office entry for Round House and Arthur Head Reserve

State Register of Heritage Places in the City of Fremantle
Landmarks in Perth, Western Australia
Tourist attractions in Perth, Western Australia
Defunct prisons in Western Australia
Prison museums in Australia
Museums in Western Australia
Centenary of Western Australia
High Street, Fremantle
1830 establishments in Australia
Heritage places in Fremantle
Round buildings in Australia